The origins of the Château de l'Hers, in Châteauneuf-du-Pape on the banks of the Rhône, go back to the beginning of the 10th century. Until the French Revolution it was an enclave of Languedoc in the Comtat Venaissin. Protected as a historic monument since 1973, it has given its name to a winery.

From prehistory to late antiquity 
Various elements of the château de l'Hers attest to the occupation of this strategically important location as a control point for river traffic, since late Antiquity at the latest. Several tombs with saddleback roofs form a small 6th-7th necropolis not far from the first known chapel of the château, dedicated to Saints Cosmas and Damian. An excavation of this ruined church found lithic industries, and sherds from antiquity and the Iron Age, fragments of Tegula tiles and a cipolin cladding probably dating to Antiquity were re-used in the masonry. A large number of weapons, coins and medals were found in the area. The tollgate on the Rhône was put in place in 79 AD under Vespasian, according to V. Millet (1864).

There must have been a Roman castrum, probably destroyed in the great invasions. This appeared under the name of castellum de Leri in a 913 charter. It was signed by Louis the Blind and ceded it to Foulques, Bishop of Avignon.

The old château of Châteauneuf-du-Pape 

In 1077, his successor Rostaing granted the fief to Pierre d'Albaron, who built a keep there. The first mention of a Castro Novo (new fortified village), which led to the name Châteauneuf-du-Pape, does not appear until 1094 It became the château de l'Hers after it was expanded in the 12th century and then was renovated for the first time during the 13th century. Certain historians have said that the Knights Templar used it at the end of the 12th century. This legend was disproven by the historians in the 20th century.

L'Hers (or Lair, or Lers), become an enclave of Languedoc on the right bank of the Rhône, the château and its village were in ruins during the 12th century. Historical texts say that the parish had two places of worship, the parish church named Sainte-Marie and the château's chapel dedicated to Saints Cosmas and Damian

Jacques d'Euze, formerly bishop of Avignon, was elected pope in 1316 and took the name John XXII. Châteauneuf fell directly under his authority. Barely pope for three months, he had construction undertaken at l'Hers. The accounts of the Apostolic Camera say that he allocated 3,000 florins to the restoration of the old 12-century château.

Rhône tollgate and watch tower 

During the Middle Ages, the old château was a watch post and toll station on the Rhône which passed to different families allied to the Albaron family.

The Albaron kept their fief until 1360, when it was transferred to the  family as a dowry. Around 1400, it came back to the Albaron de Laudin des Baux family, who kept it until the 1420s. The last heiress of this family brought it as a dowry to an Allemand. That family then took the name Allemand de Laudun Albaron. During the 16th century its toll rights fell in turn to the Arpajon Cardaillac, Monteynard and Montmorency families, then to the Duke of Lévis Ventadour. Hercule de Rohan, prince of Soubise, inherited it and his family still owned it when the French Revolution broke out.

The château in our days 
Today the château is private property. At the winery that takes its name, Marcel Georges elaborates a red Châteauneuf-du-pape with a base of Syrah, Mourvèdre, Muscardin, Counoise, Cinsault, Grenache, Vaccarese and Terret, and a white Châteauneuf-du-pape which blends Picardan, Roussanne, Clairette, Picpoul and white Grenache. With an area of 14 hectares, it's one of the rare wineries allowed to use the name, which is an appellation d'origine controllée, to offer the full array of the thirteen Châteauneuf-du-Pape varieties.

Although the winery kept the name of the château it does not include the name in its business since the château lies outside the Appellation d'origine contrôlée terroir. Only the lower chamber of the medieval keep and the 14th-century round tower remain of the château, along with a few vestiges of the ramparts. The site was registered as a monument historique in 1973.

Notes and references 

Châteaux in Vaucluse
Avignon Papacy
Society of France